Tracy Grijalva (born January 3, 1959), known as Tracy G, is an American heavy metal guitarist best known for his time with Dio from 1993 to 1999.

Early life 
Tracy's first band experience was in band called the Grijalva Brothers with his father as member. Growing up he had a few guitar instructors, one of them told him that he would have a hard time playing because "his fingers were too small". Grijalva, being the determined musician that he was, would practice until his fingers hurt.

Influences 
Tracy gives credit to Eddie Van Halen (Van Halen) and Donny Simmons (Yankee Rose, Stormer) for influencing his playing, especially referring to Simmons as 'his idol'.

Career 
He would later play in a variety of bands, including with future member of Great White, Jack Russell. He also put together the bands Love/Hate with singer Jizzy Pearl, and Swift Kick with whom he released an EP "Long Live Rock" in 1984. He would play at almost any club he could find to get his publicity out. He also played with vocalist Rudy Torres and drummer Audie Desbrow (Great White) in Riff Raff, a very popular band around southern California in the early days of hard rock and heavy metal.

Tracy then joined Dio. In his six years with the band, Tracy G was featured on two studio albums, (Strange Highways and Angry Machines), and one live album (Inferno: Last in Live). He left the band in 1999 when he was asked to play rhythm guitar while Craig Goldy took lead.   Dio decided to bring back Goldy, who had played with him on the Dream Evil album.

Tracy G formed The Tracy G Group, which included Jeremy Masana on bass guitar, Donnie Rodriguez on drums and, respectively, Tracy G on guitar.

Further, Tracy G is in the band Goad-ed. They have released two albums and Tracy has released numerous solo albums as well.
Tracey G. is working with members of Barren Cross in a new project called Gale Force. The album is called subhuman and was released in 2021.

Discography

Dio 
 Strange Highways (1993)
 Angry Machines (1996)
 Inferno: Last in Live (1998)
 Live in London, Hammersmith Apollo 1993

Swift Kick 
 Long Live Rock (1984)

Rags 
 Tear 'Em Up (1988; re-released in 2003)

WWIII 
 WWIII (1990)

Eightball Cholos 
 Satan's Whore (1996)

Tracy G 
 The G Factory (1997)
 Compilation Volume I (1999)
 Baron Von Troglenstein (1999)
 A Spooky G X-Mas (2001)
 Katt Gutt (2001)
 Deviating From the Set List (2002)
 Grijalva (2007)
 A Frosty G Christmas (2009)

Tracy G & The B.M.B. 
 Watch Out for The Cucui (1999)

Tracy G & Michael Beatty 
 Me, Myself, and The Rain (1999)

Tracy G & The Starr Track Vatos 
 Stripper Bootleg Live (2002)

The Tracy G Group 
 The Tracy G Group (2003)
 Erector Pili (2006)
 Controlled Chaos (2011)
 Tramp (2017)

Curly Fester and The Blues Quartet 
 ...Live Sessions (2003)

Driven 
 Work in Progress (1999)
 Citizen X (1999)
 Driven (2000)
 Self Inflicted (2001)

The Mark Bramlett Band 
 Fast Women and Slow Horses (2000)

Goad-ed 
 Goad-ed (2005)
 To Die is Gain (2008)

Epic 
 Metaphor (2006)

Vessyl 
 Freakz Unite (2007)

Ranfa 
 Little hard blues (2007)
Special guest in the song "I learned my lesson well"

Robot Lords of Tokyo 
 Virtue & Vice (2012)

Pain Savior 
 Dead Weight on a Dying Planet (2013)

Barking Spider 
 Warrior by Night (single) (2014)

References

External links 
Official site

Living people
1959 births
American heavy metal guitarists
Musicians from Whittier, California
Dio (band) members
People from the San Gabriel Valley
Guitarists from California
20th-century American guitarists